Coleophora bactrianae is a moth of the family Coleophoridae. It is found in Afghanistan.

References

bactrianae
Moths described in 1994
Moths of Asia